The Central Directorate for Electoral Services is the national election commission in Italy. It is the main body responsible for the management and overseeing elections in Italy. However the Municipal Electoral Offices of an area decide whether persons are allowed to vote (and other matters), whereas the Ministry of Interior compiles the election information electronically, analyses the results of elections, referendums, and has the duty of officially announcing their results.

Responsibilities 
The Central Directorate has the responsibility over:
 Equipment and materials
 Supervise and oversee the independence of polling conducted by the Ministry of Interior.

Elections in Italy
Italy